Gaeunsa is a Buddhist temple of the Jogye Order in Seoul, South Korea. Founded in 1396 it is located at 15 Anam 5-dong in the Seongbuk-gu area of the city.

See also
List of Buddhist temples in Seoul

External links
www.encyber.com

Buddhist temples in Seoul
1396 establishments in Asia
Buddhist temples of the Jogye Order
14th-century establishments in Korea